Tyler Roehl (born January 29, 1986) is an American football coach and former running back.  He was signed by the Seattle Seahawks as an undrafted free agent in 2009. He played college football for North Dakota State University. In June 2009, he was placed on the Waived/Injured list. In May 2010, he participated in the Minnesota Vikings rookie mini-camp.  Roehl tried out for the United Football League Las Vegas Locomotives. Roehl was hired as the tight ends and fullbacks coach at his alma mater, North Dakota State, for 2014 season.

Early years
Roehl was born and raised in West Fargo, North Dakota where he played high school football for the West Fargo Packers as a running back and linebacker. One of the most productive players in North Dakota high school history, he was a two-time first team All-State, two-time first team All-EDC and two-time team MVP. Tyler was a big reason why the Packers won back to back state championships in 2002 and 2003 as he was the game MVP in both title games.

Roehl ran for 1,269 yards, 25 touchdowns, and averaged 8.7 yards per carry on offense and also had 51 tackles and three interceptions on defense as a senior. This led to Tyler becoming the Class AAA Player of the Year in North Dakota in 2003. He also holds the team record for total points scored with 290.

Roehl also excelled in baseball where he was a four-time letter winner and an All-EDC performer in 2004.

College career
Roehl received a scholarship to play college football at North Dakota State University, as a running back.

As a freshman, Roehl played in all 11 games during his first year at NDSU. However, he was primarily used as a blocking back. Roehl only carried the ball twice for 14 yards that season.

Roehl was redshirted the following year because he broke his leg during a spring practice in 2005.

As a sophomore, Roehl started in 10 of 11 games. Roehl became more of a threat out of the backfield with 22 receptions for 259 yards and one touchdown and averaged 11.8 yards per reception. Roehl made a season-high five receptions for 70 yards in 31–7 win at Southern Utah on October 28, 2006. Roehl also reeled off a 41-yard catch in the 29–24 win over Ball State on September 23, 2006. Roehl made his first touchdown catch against Mississippi Valley State on October 14, 2006. However, Roehl only rushed seven times for 14 yards and one touchdown.

Roehl's junior year was huge success for him. Roehl started in 10 games played and racked up 1,431 yards and 21 touchdowns on 207 carries and averaged 6.9 yards per carry. Roehl also had 20 receptions for 180 yards. Roehl became just the third NDSU football player to earn CoSIDA Academic All-America first team honors and was also named to the Associated Press, The Sports Network and Dopke College Sports Report.com FCS All-America second teams. Roehl was an All-Great West Football Conference first team selection by coaches and media and was also a four-time GWFC Offensive Player of the Week. Tyler led the Great West in rushing, scoring and all-purpose yards that year. Roehl's biggest achievement was his three games with 200-plus yards including 238 yards and 3 touchdowns on 27 carries in the season opener against Stephen F. Austin on September 8, 2007, 263 yards on 22 carries against Minnesota on October 20, 2007 including 77 yard touchdown run to earn an ESPN College Gameday helmet sticker and USA Today Player of the Week, and 257 yards and four touchdowns vs. Illinois State. Tyler also recorded six games with 100-yards rushing and scored at least two touchdowns in six games that year.

Roehl's senior year was just as productive as the previous year. He was Sporting News' College Football preseason All-American Team. He finished the season with 1,053 yards and 13 touchdowns on 171 carries and averaged 6.2 yards per carry. He also caught 13 passes for 101 yards.

College statistics
In the 2005 season, Roehl was redshirted because of a broken leg suffered during a spring practice his freshman year.

Professional career

Seattle Seahawks

Roehl was signed by the Seattle Seahawks as an undrafted free agent on April 26, 2009.  During an offseason workout on June 1, 2009, Roehl suffered a torn anterior cruciate ligament on his left knee which subsequently ended his season.  His was placed on the Injured/Waived list for that season. He was released by the Seahawks on March 15, 2010.

Minnesota Vikings
Roehl attended the Minnesota Vikings rookie mini-camp from April 28, 2010 to May 2, 2010. He left unsigned.

Las Vegas Locomotives
On May 16, 2010, Roehl was at the open tryouts for the Las Vegas Locomotives of the United Football League (UFL).

Coaching career
Roehl spent the 2010 season as the running backs coach and junior varsity offensive coordinator at Concordia College in Moorhead. He was NDSU's offensive graduate assistant in 2011. Roehl spent two years on the Moorhead High School football staff. He returned to his alma mater as the tight ends and fullbacks coach in January 2014.

References

External links
 North Dakota State profile

1986 births
Living people
American football running backs
Concordia Cobbers football coaches
North Dakota State Bison football coaches
North Dakota State Bison football players
Seattle Seahawks players
High school football coaches in Minnesota
People from West Fargo, North Dakota
Coaches of American football from North Dakota
Players of American football from North Dakota